The 31st Daytime Emmy Awards, commemorating excellence in American daytime programming from 2003, was held on May 21, 2004 at Radio City Music Hall in New York City, Vanessa Marcil hosted. Creative Arts Emmy Awards were presented on May 15, 2004. , it is the last Daytime Emmy Awards ceremony to have aired on NBC. The nominees were announced on May 4, 2004.

Nominations and winners
The following is a partial list of nominees, with winners in bold:

Outstanding Drama Series
As the World Turns
The Bold and the Beautiful
General Hospital
Guiding Light
The Young and the Restless

Outstanding Lead Actor in a Drama Series
Grant Aleksander (Phillip Spaulding, Guiding Light)
Maurice Benard (Sonny Corinthos, General Hospital)
Eric Braeden (Victor Newman, The Young and the Restless)
Anthony Geary (Luke Spencer, General Hospital)
Roger Howarth (Paul Ryan, As the World Turns)
Thorsten Kaye (Ian Thornhart, Port Charles)

Outstanding Lead Actress in a Drama Series
Tamara Braun (Carly Corinthos, General Hospital)
Nancy Lee Grahn (Alexis Davis, General Hospital)
Michelle Stafford (Phyllis Abbott, The Young and the Restless)
Maura West (Carly Snyder, As the World Turns)
Kim Zimmer (Reva Lewis, Guiding Light)

Outstanding Supporting Actor in a Drama Series
William deVry (Michael Cambias, All My Children)
Rick Hearst (Ric Lansing, General Hospital)
Christian LeBlanc (Michael Baldwin, The Young and the Restless)
Ron Raines (Alan Spaulding, Guiding Light)
James Reynolds (Abe Carver, Days of Our Lives)

Outstanding Supporting Actress in a Drama Series
Kathy Brier (Marcie Walsh, One Life to Live)
Sharon Case (Sharon Newman, The Young and the Restless)
Ilene Kristen (Roxy Balsom, One Life to Live)
Cady McClain (Rosanna Cabot, As the World Turns)
Heather Tom (Victoria Newman, The Young and the Restless)

Outstanding Younger Actor in a Drama Series
Chad Brannon (Zander Smith, General Hospital)
Scott Clifton (Dillon Quartermaine, General Hospital)
Agim Kaba (Aaron Snyder, As the World Turns)
David Lago (Raul Guittierez, The Young and the Restless)
Brian Presley (Jack Ramsey, Port Charles)

Outstanding Younger Actress in a Drama Series
Jennifer Finnigan (Bridget Forrester, The Bold and the Beautiful)
Christel Khalil (Lily Winters, The Young and the Restless)
Eden Riegel (Bianca Montgomery, All My Children)
Alicia Leigh Willis (Courtney Matthews, General Hospital)
Lauren Woodland (Brittany Hodges, The Young and the Restless)

Outstanding Drama Series Writing Team
All My Children
As the World Turns
General Hospital
The Young and the Restless

Outstanding Drama Series Directing Team
General Hospital
One Life to Live
Passions
The Young and the Restless

Outstanding Game/Audience Participation Show
Jeopardy!
The Price is Right
Who Wants to be a Millionaire

Outstanding Game Show Host
Bob Barker, The Price is Right
Alex Trebek, Jeopardy!
Meredith Vieira, Who Wants to be a Millionaire

Outstanding Talk Show
Dr. Phil
The Ellen DeGeneres Show
Live With Regis and Kelly
The View
The Wayne Brady Show

Outstanding Talk Show Host
Wayne Brady, The Wayne Brady Show
Ellen DeGeneres, The Ellen DeGeneres Show
Phil McGraw, Dr. Phil
Regis Philbin and Kelly Ripa, Live With Regis and Kelly
Barbara Walters, Meredith Vieira, Star Jones and Joy Behar, The View

Outstanding Service Show
Essence of Emeril
Great Hotels
Martha Stewart Living
The Suze Orman Show
This Old House

Outstanding Service Show Host
Bobby Flay, Boy Meets Grill
Emeril Lagasse, Essence of Emeril
Kevin O'Connor, This Old House
Suze Orman, The Suze Orman Show
Martha Stewart, Martha Stewart Living

Outstanding Special Class Series
Animal Rescue with Alex Paen
A Baby Story
Judge Judy
Trading Spaces: Boys vs. Girls
When I Was a Girl

Outstanding Children's Animated Program
Arthur
Dora the Explorer
Kim Possible
Little Bill
Rugrats

Outstanding Special Class Animated Program
Duck Dodgers
Fillmore!
Ozzy & Drix
Rolie Polie Olie
Static Shock
Tutenstein

Outstanding Individual Achievement in Animation
Dan Kuenster (Jakers! The Adventures of Piggley Winks)

Outstanding Music Direction and Composition
Richard Wolf (Static Shock)
Mike Renzi, Glen Daum, Stephen Lawrence, Tony Geiss, Dave Conner, and Danny Epstein (Sesame Street)
Paul Jacobs, Christopher Cerf, Sarah Durkee, Thomas Z. Shepard, Fred Newman, Sharon Lerner, and Chris Cardillo (Between the Lions)
Michael Rubin and Nick Balaban (Blue's Clues)
Van Dyke Parks and Kevin Kiner (Stuart Little: The Animated Series)
Peter Michael Escovedo (The Wayne Brady Show)

Outstanding Performer In An Animated Program
Joe Alaskey (Duck Dodgers, Duck Dodgers)
Nancy Cartwright, (Rufus, Kim Possible)
Walter Cronkite (Benjamin Franklin, Liberty's Kids)
John Ritter (Clifford, Clifford the Big Red Dog)
Henry Winkler (Norville, Clifford's Puppy Days)

Outstanding Pre-School Children's SeriesBear in the Big Blue HouseBlue's CluesSesame StreetOutstanding Children's SeriesAssignment DiscoveryBetween the LionsJeff Corwin UnleashedOperation JunkyardScout's SafariZOOMOutstanding Performer in a Children's Series
Kevin Clash (Elmo, Sesame Street)
Jeff Corwin (Himself, Jeff Corwin Unleashed)
David Rudman (Cookie Monster, Sesame Street)
Lynne Thigpen (Luna, Bear in the Big Blue House)
Michelle Trachtenberg (Host/Narrator, Truth or Scare)

Lifetime Achievement Award
The Lifetime Achievement Award was awarded to 10 veteran soap opera performers in recognition of their many years of service to the genre:
Rachel Ames (Audrey Hardy, General Hospital, 1964–2007, 2009, 2013, 2015)
John Clarke (Mickey Horton, Days of our Lives, 1965–2004)
Jeanne Cooper (Katherine Chancellor, The Young and the Restless, 1973–2013)
Eileen Fulton (Lisa Grimaldi, As the World Turns, 1960–1964, 1966–1983, 1984–2010)
Don Hastings (Bob Hughes, As the World Turns, 1960–2010)
Anna Lee* (Lila Quartermaine, General Hospital, 1978–2003)
Ray MacDonnell (Joe Martin, All My Children, 1970–2010, 2011, 2013)
Frances Reid (Alice Horton, Days of our Lives, 1965-2007)
Helen Wagner (Nancy Hughes, As the World Turns, 1956-2010)
Ruth Warrick (Phoebe Tyler Wallingford, All My Children'', 1970-2005)

* - Anna Lee died a week before the awards ceremony and was honored with a brief moment during the telecast. Her award was accepted on her behalf by her son, actor Jeffrey Byron.

References

External links
 

031
Daytime Emmy Awards

it:Premi Emmy 2004#Premi Emmy per il Daytime